Pivotal Games Limited was a British video game developer based in Corston, England.

History 
Pivotal Games was founded in March 2000, by fifteen employees formerly of Pumpkin Studios (the developer of Warzone 2100), led by Jim Bambra, Nick Cook and Alex McLean. Pumpkin Studios, founded by Bambra and Cook in August 1996, had previously been closed down by its parent company, Eidos Interactive, that same month. In August 2000, the company was acquired by Kaboom Studios. Between 2002 and 2008, Pivotal Games developed all five instalments in the Conflict series, as well as The Great Escape, based on the film of the same name.

In September 2003, after financial struggles of parent company Kaboom Studios, who had at that point had already closed down sister studios Attention to Detail and Silicon Dreams Studio, SCi showed interest in acquiring the company. Kaboom Studios went into receivership on 9 September 2003, with all remaining assets, including still-active Pivotal Games, being transferred to Ernst & Young for sale. In May 2005, SCi Games finalised its acquisition and merger with Eidos Interactive, the parent of Eidos Interactive, which would become in charge of SCi Games' subsidiaries. In March 2008, SCi Games closed down fourteen operating projects to counter an  net loss from the preceding fiscal year, leading to rumours that Pivotal Games was also to be closed. On 14 July 2008, it was officially announced that the studio was to shut its doors, and 99 staff had already been made redundant, leaving only a team of 10–12 specialist personnel. Pivotal Games was closed on 13 August 2008.

Games developed

Conflict series 
The Conflict franchise has sold more than 6 million units. Each game in the series has received good to negative reviews. Most of the reviews were mixed or average.

Games 
Conflict: Desert Storm (2002) is set during the Persian Gulf War. The player can either play as the British Armed Forces 22 SAS Regiment or the United States Army Delta Force.
Conflict: Desert Storm II (2003), also released as Conflict: Desert Storm II - Back to Baghdad, is also set during the Gulf War and see the same characters returning to Baghdad.
Conflict: Vietnam (2004) is set during the Vietnam War. The previous characters in the first two games are not present and new characters are introduced into the game.
Conflict: Global Terror (2005; also called Conflict: Global Storm) is set during modern day. The game reunites the characters from Conflict: Desert Storm and Conflict: Desert Storm II with one additional character.
Conflict: Denied Ops is also set during modern day. The game only sees the return of Paul Foley last seen in Conflict: Global Terror and new characters are introduced into the game.

References 

Eidos
Video game development companies
Video game companies established in 2000
Video game companies disestablished in 2008
Defunct video game companies of the United Kingdom
Companies based in Somerset